Ababkuri Yahuza (born 8 August 1983 in Sekondi-Takoradi) is a Ghanaian former football player.

Career
After spells playing in Israel, Yahuza returned to Ghana where he played for New Edubiase United until he suffered a career-ending injury in 2012.

International career
Yahuza has made several appearances for the Ghana national football team, including two qualifying matches for the 2006 FIFA World Cup. He was part of the Ghanaian 2004 Olympic football team, who exited in the first round, having finished in third place in group B.

References

1983 births
Living people
Ghanaian footballers
Olympic footballers of Ghana
Footballers at the 2004 Summer Olympics
Hapoel Kfar Saba F.C. players
Hapoel Ironi Kiryat Shmona F.C. players
Expatriate footballers in Israel
King Faisal Babes FC players
New Edubiase United F.C. players
Association football midfielders
Ghana international footballers